The Bruno Pontecorvo Prize is an award for elementary particle physics, established in 1995 by the JINR in Dubna to commemorate Bruno Pontecorvo. The prize is mainly given for neutrino physics, which was Pontecorvo's principal research field, and usually to a single scientist. It is offered internationally every year.

Winners

See also

 List of physics awards

References 

Particle physics
Physics awards
Russian science and technology awards